Rubén Sanz Alonso (born 30 April 1980) is a Spanish former footballer who played as a midfielder.

He spent 13 years of his career with Alcorcón, his professional input with the club consisting of 149 Segunda División matches over six seasons (four goals).

Club career
Born in Valladolid, Castile and León, Sanz started playing football with Real Valladolid B. After a brief spell with UP Langreo he signed with AD Alcorcón also from Segunda División B, where he remained until his retirement more than one decade later.

Sanz appeared in only 19 games in his first season in Segunda División, 2010–11 (out of 42), but became an undisputed starter as in his previous years from there onwards. He was also in Alcorcón's starting XI in the club's 4–0 home thrashing of Real Madrid in the 2009–10 edition of the Copa del Rey (4–1 aggregate win).

On 24 June 2016, after 432 competitive appearances, Sanz left the Alfareros and joined neighbours CF Fuenlabrada as a free agent.

References

External links

1980 births
Living people
Footballers from Valladolid
Spanish footballers
Association football midfielders
Segunda División players
Segunda División B players
Tercera División players
Real Valladolid Promesas players
UP Langreo footballers
AD Alcorcón footballers
CF Fuenlabrada footballers